William Llewellyn may refer to:
 Sir William Llewellyn (painter), Welsh painter
 William Llewellyn (bishop), Church of England bishop
 William Llewellyn (priest), Anglican priest
 William H. H. Llewellyn, member of the New Mexico House of Representatives
 Willie Llewellyn, Welsh rugby union player

See also